Roknabad or Rukanabad or Ruknabad or Rowkhnabad may refer to:

Ardabil Province

Fars Province
Roknabad, Lamerd, a village in Lamerd County
Roknabad, Pasargad, a village in Pasargad County
Roknabad, Sarvestan, a village in Sarvestan County
Roknabad, Shiraz, a stream near Shiraz

Hormozgan Province
Roknabad, Hormozgan, a village in Hormozgan Province, Iran

Isfahan Province
Roknabad, Isfahan, a village in Lenjan County

Kerman Province
Roknabad 1, a village in Bardsir County
Roknabad 2, a village in Bardsir County
Roknabad, Rafsanjan, a village in Rafsanjan County

Lorestan Province
Roknabad, Lorestan, a village in Lorestan Province, Iran

Razavi Khorasan Province
Roknabad, Razavi Khorasan, a village in Razavi Khorasan Province, Iran

Semnan Province
Roknabad, Semnan, a village in Semnan Province, Iran

Sistan and Baluchestan Province
Roknabad, Sistan and Baluchestan, a village in Sistan and Baluchestan Province, Iran

Yazd Province
Roknabad, Yazd, a village in Meybod County